1635: The Papal Stakes is novel in the 1632 series written by Charles Gannon and Eric Flint. It was published in 2012 and is the direct sequel to 1635: The Cannon Law published in 2006. This book is the third in the South European fork to the main 1632 series storyline. The story follows the exploits of younger members of the Stone family in Italy and describes the impact of Grantville on the Roman Catholic church and on the patchwork of independent countries in the Italian peninsula.

Literary significance and reception
The reviewer for SFRevu writes that "Charles Gannon takes the helm in this installment" and that "Gannon hits all the right notes." The Midwest Book Review called the book "a fabulous thriller as Eric Flint and Charles E. Gannon prove a deft pairing." The reviewer for the Mixed Book Bag also agrees that Flint and Gannon make a good writing team and adds "This is a story that flows smoothly and is focused on the problems the characters face" and "the action is great and keeps the story arc moving along".

1635: The Papal Stakes is the first book in the 1632 series to get listed on The Wall Street Journal Best-Selling Books list for Hardcover Science Fiction, which gets its data from NPD BookScan (formerly Nielsen BookScan). This book was able to stay on this list for two weeks during October 2012, topping at number 6.

References

External links
 

1632 series books
2012 American novels
American science fiction novels
American alternate history novels
Baen Books books
Books by Eric Flint
Collaborative novels
Novels by David Weber
Fiction set in 1636
Novels set in the 1630s